Saluga Pradhan is an Indian politician from the Biju Janata Dal, who was elected from the G. Udayagiri assembly constituency from the state of Orissa in 2019.

Career

2019 elections
In the 2019 Odisha Legislative Assembly election, Pradhan won the G Udaygiri seat, defeating the sitting Member of the Legislative Assembly Jacob Pradhan of the Indian National Congress.

References

Living people
Year of birth missing (living people)
People from Kandhamal district
Odisha MLAs 2019–2024
Biju Janata Dal politicians